Herbert Karl Oehmichen (August 14, 1915 – July 23, 1990) was an American male handball player. He was a member of the United States men's national handball team. He was part of the  team at the 1936 Summer Olympics, playing 2 matches. On club level he played for German-American AC Queens in the United States.

References

Field handball players at the 1936 Summer Olympics
1915 births
1990 deaths
American male handball players
Olympic handball players of the United States
Sportspeople from New York (state)
20th-century American people